Vishvanatha Deva Gajapati was the king of Kalinga who established a kingdom in the region of Odisha and Andhra Pradesh, historically known as Kalinga. He belonged to the Suryavansha dynasty that was installed in the region by his grandfather Vinayaka Dev who was a prince of the ancient branch of the dynasty, he migrated from Kashmir to Nandapura - a kingdom in Southern Odisha.

Early life
Vishwanath Dev was the son of Rajah Bhairav Dev of Nandapur who were a vassal state of the Gajapatis. The Suryavansh dynasty arrived in the region in mid-15th century from Kashmir with the arrival of Vinayak Dev who married Princess Lilavati the daughter of last Silavamsi ruler and ascended the small kingdom of Nandapur. Later, Vinayak conquered the southern territories up to Rajahmundry and Srikakulam in the east. This kingdom however remained loyal and was annexed to the Gajapati empire. Evidently, Vishwanath is the fourth king in Vinayak's line and ascended the throne in 1527 during the reign of Prataprudra Deva. In 1509, his father Bhairav Dev along with other vassal kingdoms accompanied Prataprudra Deva in the battle of Kondapalli fort against Krishnadeva Raya of Vijayanagar Empire. Therefore, Vishwanath remained an ally of the Gajapati emperor.

Reign
After the death of Prataprudra Deva in 1540 his sons Kalua Deva and Khakura Deva were made kings and later assassinated by their minister Govinda Vidyadhar. This led to the fall of the Gajapati empire and all vassal kingdoms claimed independence. The Bhoi dynasty continued to rule Puri and the region adjoining the states of Jharkhand and West Bengal. 
Vishwanath Dev sent an arny against the Bhoi kings by sending an army under Mukunda Harichandran of Cossimkota to annex the northern region and make Govinda Vidyadhar accept the suzerainty of Vishwanath whose southern territory touched the Krishna-Godavari region of Telangana. The fifth report on the affairs of the company describe him as :

He built the city of Rayagada and Majhighariani Temple on the banks of Nagavali. A Brahmin at his court named Simha Vajapeya who wrote treatises on law and philosophy helped him perform the Vajapeya Yagna at the new town of Vishwanathpur,  recorded in the genealogy of the Vajapeya family of Biranarasingh Pur near Puri. He adopted the title of 'Gajapati' which meant 'owner of elephants' and in Odisha is a symbolic term for an emperor, a title was made popular by the Gajapati dynasty of Cuttack.

Aftermath and death
Mukunda Dev rebelled and killed the last two successors of the Bhoi dynasty and also crushed the rebellion of Raghubhanj Chottaray. He declared himself an independent ruler in 1559 but Sulaiman Khan Karrani formed a kingdom in the region of Bengal which proved a potential threat to Mukund Dev. Vishwanath lost his northern territories to Mukund and was later challenged by Ibrahim Qutb Shah in the banks of Godavari in southern territory. He stopped the advance of the Qutb Shahi army and later signed a peace treaty with the Sultan of Golconda in which both parties agreed to mark Godavari as the border between the two kingdoms. However, this treaty was squashed after the death of Vishwanath Gajapati in 1571 as the Qutb Shahis militarily encroached the eastern parts of the kingdom lying adjacent to Bay of Bengal which made Balaram Dev accept the suzerainty of Golconda.

References

 
 
 
 
 

1500 births
1571 deaths
People from Odisha
Suryavansha